Mwanda is a settlement in Kenya's Taita Taveta County. Its Bordered By Mghange and Mwakitau. Its In Wundanyi Constituency.

References 

Populated places in Coast Province